Lakshmi Unnikrishnan K (born 2 September 1991), better known by her stage name Lakshmi Nakshathra, is an Indian television presenter and radio jockey who works in Malayalam television and stage shows. She is best known for hosting Star Magic on Flowers TV.

Early life

Lakshmi was born in Koorkenchery, Thrissur, to Unnikrishnan and Bindu. She began learning classical music from age seven and has won prizes in acting, monoact, and music competitions in Kerala School Kalolsavam. She completed her schooling from St.Paul's convent school, Kuriachira and I.E.S Public School, Thrissur. In 2009, she joined Christ College, Irinjalakuda for taking Bachelor of Arts (BA) degree in Functional English, and later joined Elijah Institute of Management Studies (ELIMS), Thrissur for her Master of Business Administration (MBA) post-graduation specialized in Marketing and Human Resource.

Career
She started her career as a Radio Jockey in Red FM in 2007. Lakshmi started her career as a VJ from a cable channel in Thrissur and later selected to host programmes in Jeevan TV (2008) School time which was a programme for school children to showcase their talents and Its "Really Tasty" which was a cookery show specialised in south Indian cuisine. Lakshmi also hosted Onam special programme in Amrita TV which was named as "Campus Onakkalam", "Chit chat" in WE Channel  where she interviewed leading actors and actresses of south India, "Dew drops (2009)" in WE channel, which was a popular Malayalam television, Live phone-in-programme which laid a milestone in her career as an anchor.

List of works

Television

Stage events
She has hosted stage shows in South India, Abu Dhabi, and Doha.

Films

Awards and recognition

References

External links

1991 births
Living people
Indian women radio presenters
Indian radio presenters
Indian women television presenters
Indian television presenters
Actresses in Malayalam television
Indian television actresses
Indian VJs (media personalities)
Actresses from Thrissur
Television personalities from Kerala
Female models from Kerala